Passel Pond is a meltwater pond lying at the southwest foot of Mount Passel in the Denfeld Mountains of the Ford Ranges, Marie Byrd Land. The pond was first mapped by the United States Antarctic Service (USAS), 1939–41. Named by Advisory Committee on Antarctic Names (US-ACAN) in association with Mount Passel.

References 

Lakes of Antarctica
Bodies of water of Marie Byrd Land